Future Systems was a London-based architectural and design practice, formerly headed by Directors Jan Kaplický and Amanda Levete.

Future Systems was founded by Kaplický and David Nixon after working with Denys Lasdun, Norman Foster, Renzo Piano, and Richard Rogers in 1979.  The work of Future Systems can be classified within the British high-tech architects as either bionic architecture or amorphous, organic shapes sometimes referred to as "blobitecture". "Compared to his peers, Kaplicky was the avant-garde incarnate, relentlessly pursuing the new new thing, refusing to settle into some predictable, and comfortable, architectural niche."

Practice
Future Systems proposals adapted construction methods from other professions, including (most commonly) the curved monocoque shell structures found in aircraft design, car design and boat building.

In the 1990s the company moved from theoretical projects to fee-paying work with projects such as the "spacecraft-like" Media Centre at Lord's Cricket Ground in London (completed 1999), and the Selfridges Building (completed 2003). For Lord's, Kaplicky received the Stirling Prize. The Selfridges department store is a prime example of the early 21st century movement referred to as "blobitecture", and has been compared to Peter Cook's Kunsthaus in Graz, Austria.

After Future Systems won the Stirling Prize, the firm received larger commissions including the Enzo Ferrari Museum in Modena, Italy (2009) and the unbuilt new Czech National Library. In 2008 Kaplický and Levete split the firm. Kaplický took the firm name and some staff to the Czech republic, and Levete would take a proposed new headquarters for News Corporation in east London and a commission for a hotel and retail complex in Bangkok, Thailand, along with most of the staff – between 35 and 45 people.

History

1979 Founded by Jan Kaplicky and David Nixon while working at Foster Associates.

1989 Joined by Amanda Levete who arrives from Richard Rogers & Partners to become a partner.

1994 Completed the well received Hauer-King house in Islington.

1999 Won the Stirling Prize for Lord's Cricket Ground media centre.

2003 Completed the Selfridges building at the regenerated Bull Ring shopping centre in Birmingham.

2007 Won the commission for the controversial Czech National Library.

2008 Split into two practices after Kaplicky and Levete officially separate as business partners.

2008 Submits design of London Routemaster bus.

2008 Czech National Library project cancelled by Prague authorities.

2009 Jan Kaplický dies on 14 January 2009 in Prague, Czech Republic. A month later the final few staff working for Kaplický/Future Systems in Levete's offices were let go.

Gallery

References

Sources

Further reading

Articles

"Interview with Jan Kaplicky-Future Systems" by Alessandra Orlandoni- The Plan 008 January 2005
Article on the architecture of the new Bull Ring shopping centre

Books

External links
Official website of Future Systems

STORIES OF HOUSES: House in Pembrokeshire (Wales), by Future Systems

Architecture firms based in London
Stirling Prize laureates
Design companies established in 1979
Companies disestablished in 2009
1979 establishments in England
2009 disestablishments in England
British companies disestablished in 2009
British companies established in 1979